Today's Melodies (Spanish: Melodías de hoy) is a 1960 Spanish musical film directed by José María Elorrieta.

Cast
 Elder Barber 
 Alberto Berco 
 Francisco Bernal 
 Celia Conde 
 José Luis 
 Katia Loritz 
 Matilde Muñoz Sampedro 
 Juan Antonio Riquelme 
 José María Tasso

References

Bibliography 
 Pascual Cebollada & Luis Rubio Gil. Enciclopedia del cine español: cronología''. Ediciones del Serbal, 1996.

External links 
 

1960 musical films
Spanish musical films
1960 films
1960s Spanish-language films
Films directed by José María Elorrieta
Films scored by Augusto Algueró
1960s Spanish films